The Toronto Journal of Theology is a peer-reviewed academic journal of theology published by the University of Toronto Press. Current editor-in-chief is Abrahim H. Khan (University of Toronto). The journal is indexed in Scopus.

Abstracting and indexing 
The journal is abstracted and indexed in:

See also
Canadian Journal of Theology (1955-1970)

References

External links 
 
 Online access at Project MUSE

University of Toronto Press academic journals
Publications established in 1985
Biannual journals
English-language journals
Academic journals published by university presses
Religious studies journals
1985 establishments in Ontario